Syritta maritima is a species of syrphid fly in the family Syrphidae.

Distribution
Christmas Island.

References

Eristalinae
Diptera of Asia
Insects described in 1944